The 2002 Bridgestone Grand Prix of Monterey was the fifth round of the 2002 CART FedEx Champ Car World Series season, held on June 9, 2002 at Mazda Raceway Laguna Seca in Monterey, California.

Qualifying results

Race

Caution flags

Notes 

 New Race Record Cristiano da Matta 1:55:28.745
 Average Speed 101.164 mph

External links
 Friday Qualifying Results
 Saturday Qualifying Results
 Race Results

Monterey
Monterey Grand Prix